Forever So is the official debut studio album by Australian indie folk band Husky, released in 2012 on Sub Pop Records and mixed by Noah Georgeson. It includes the song "History's Door" that won the triple j Unearthed contest.

At the ARIA Music Awards of 2012, the album was nominated for ARIA Award for Best Adult Contemporary Album.

Track listing

Charts

Release history

References

2011 albums
Husky (band) albums
Liberation Records albums
Sub Pop albums